Joseph E. Monroe (born c.1830) was a state legislator in Mississippi. He was photographed by E. von Seutter.

He was born in Kentucky. He represented Coahoma County in the Mississippi House of Representatives from 1874 to 1877. He was a member of the Knights of Pythias.

Monroe and his wife, Jane, had two children. She was listed as a widow in 1900.

See also
African-American officeholders during and following the Reconstruction era

References

Year of birth uncertain
Year of death missing
Reconstruction Era
African-American politicians